The LAK-20 is a Lithuanian Open Class two-seat sailplane produced by Sportinė Aviacija.

Design and development
The LAK-20 is an Open Class two-seat sailplane with a wingspan of 23-metres or 26-metres. Made out of modern composite materials, it features a T-tail and retractable landing gear. The wings are slightly swept forward and interchangeable outer wing panels are provided to enable it to fly with a wingspan of either 23 metres or 26 metres. The glider is available as the self-sustaining LAK-20T variant or the self-launching LAK-20M variant, both equipped with an engine. The engines used are two-stroke two-cylinder retractable engines from engine manufacturer SOLO.

Variants
LAK-20T
Production variant, self-sustaining sailplane with a 22 kW (30 hp) two-stroke two-cylinder air-cooled Solo 2350C retractable engine. 
LAK-20M
Production variant, self-launching sailplane with a 47 kW (64 hp) two-stroke two-cylinder liquid-cooled Solo 2625 02 retractable engine.

Specifications (LAK-20T 26-metre)

References

LAK aircraft
Lithuanian sailplanes